Sclerophrys turkanae, the Lake Turkana toad or Turkana toad, is a species of toad in the family Bufonidae. It is endemic to Kenya, and is only known from two localities; Loiyangalani on the southeastern shores of Lake Turkana, and the Ewaso Ng'iro River in the Samburu National Reserve.

It is known from arid semi-desert regions with nearby permanent water (either lake or river). Breeding and larval development presumably takes place in water. Threats to this poorly known species are unknown.

References

turkanae
Frogs of Africa
Amphibians of Kenya
Endemic fauna of Kenya
Amphibians described in 1985
Taxonomy articles created by Polbot